Olfactory receptor 1G1 is a protein that in humans is encoded by the OR1G1 gene.

Function 

Olfactory receptors interact with odorant molecules in the nose, to initiate a neuronal response that triggers the perception of a smell. The olfactory receptor proteins are members of a large family of G-protein-coupled receptors (GPCR) arising from single coding-exon genes. Olfactory receptors share a 7-transmembrane domain structure with many neurotransmitter and hormone receptors and are responsible for the recognition and G protein-mediated transduction of odorant signals. The olfactory receptor gene family is the largest in the genome. The nomenclature assigned to the olfactory receptor genes and proteins for this organism is independent of other organisms.

Ligands 
The OR1G1 receptor is associated with sensory sensations including "waxy", "fatty", and "rose", and also "fruity" and "sweet".

Compared to other olfactory receptors such as OR52D1, OR1G1 is broadly tuned to respond to odorants in different chemical classes, but it is sensitive to chain length, responding most strongly to chains of 9-10 carbons.

Examples of agonists include:
 nonanal (strong)
 1-nonanol (strong)
 2-ethyl-1-hexanol (strong)
 γ-decalactone (strong)
 ethyl isobutyrate (strong)
 1-octanol
 celery ketone
 citral
 isoamyl acetate

Example antagonists include:
 hexanal
 1-hexanol
 cyclohexanone

The pattern of 6-carbon antagonists compared to ~9-carbon agonists is likely explained by OR1G1 having a deep pocket at its binding site, such that the 6-carbon molecules block the opening, but do not reach the bottom of the deep pocket as required to activate the signal transduction chain.

See also 
 Olfactory receptor

References

Further reading

External links 
 

Olfactory receptors